Tantrix is a hexagonal tile-based abstract game invented by Mike McManaway from New Zealand.  Each of the 56 different tiles in the set contains three lines, going from one edge of the tile to another.  No two lines on a tile have the same colour.  There are four colours in the set: red, yellow, blue, and green.  No two tiles are identical, and each is individually numbered from 1 through 56.

Gameplay
In the multiplayer version of the game, each player chooses a colour, so there are between two and four players.  Each draws one tile from the bag, and the person who draws the highest number goes first.

Each player then takes five more tiles from the bag, and places all six tiles face up in front of them. The first person plays one tile, usually with their colour on it. Play then rotates clockwise. After playing a tile, each player takes a replacement tile from the bag, so that they always have six in front of them. Tiles played must match the colour of the edges adjoining it.

When three tiles surround an empty space so that it is effectively half covered this is called a forced space. If the person whose turn it is has a tile that fills that space they must play it. The player repeats this process until there are no more forced spaces that they can fill, at which stage they make a free move, where they can play any tile as long as they don't breach the three restriction rules given below.  Once they have had a free move, they must then fill any more forced spaces that they can. Thus one player's turn can consist of several moves. 

The three restriction rules are:

Once there are no tiles left in the bag, the three restriction rules do not apply.

The aim of the game is to get the longest line or loop in your colour.  Each tile in a line counts as one point, and in a loop is two points.  Only the highest-scoring line or loop counts.

Online play

Although quiet and underpopulated compared to the standards of Yahoo! Games and the like, playing Tantrix online has gained a dedicated following with players from all over the world competing against each other or against computer robots. Players are rated out of 1000 points according to their wins and losses and taking into account of their opponents rank. The aim of top players is to get to 1000 points (which only three players have managed so far). The goal of a regular player is to reach the score of 950 which is difficult to reach. Once this score has been attained the player can gain Tournament Rankings (ELO) and eventually earn the title "Master". Masters can then play "master games" which have a different scoring system. Only a few players achieve master status, with a limit of 120 total imposed.

Serious players of Tantrix take part in a number of structured tournaments each year. Although the winners only play for bragging rights, and in the major tournaments a small trophy to keep for a year, these events are taken seriously, and are the ultimate challenge for tantricists.

The WORLD TANTRIX CHAMPIONSHIP begins every August, and takes nearly four months to complete. Only 47 competitors took place in the second WTC in 1998, but that number had grown to 200 by 2006. The tournament starts in a qualifying round, where the lower-ranked players compete for selection into the main draw (128-player knockout tournament).

There are three other "world-wide" tournaments held online each year:

 The World Team Tantrix Championship (WTTC)  involving teams of five from one country or region, first in held in 2002
 The World Junior Tantrix Championship (WJTC)  a world championship for players under 16, first held in 2002
 The World Doubles Tantrix Championship (WDTC)  first played in 2005

There are also three continental tournaments each year:

 The European Championship (Euro)  the major dedicated continental tournament, first run in 1999
 The Pan-American Tantrix Championship (Pan-Am)  first held in 1999
 The Afro-Asian Championship (AsAf) the African Championship was first held in 1999 once, then re-established in 2004, incorporating Asian competitors at the same time

And many national online tournaments:
 The New Zealand Tantrix Championship  first held in 2000
 The Australian Tantrix Championship   first held in 2001
 The Hungarian Tantrix Championship  first held in 2002
 The Hungarian Masters Tournament  first held in 2002
 The Swedish Tantrix Championship   first held in 2003
 The French Tantrix Championship   first held in 2007
 The Dutch Tantrix Championship  first held in 2008
 The German Tantrix Championship  first held in 2008
 The Spanish Tantrix Championship  first held in 2008
 The Polish Tantrix Championship  first held in 2008
 The Norwegian Tantrix Championship  first held in 2009
 The Czech Tantrix Championship first held in 2010

Face-to-face play
In addition to these online tournaments, offline tournaments (referred to as 'Table Opens') are growing in popularity. The first Table tournament was the 2002 British Open and was mostly a local affair with 13 of the 14 entrants from Britain. As the player base widened, players started traveling more. Table Opens in Europe soon became the most popular because of the larger playing population.  By 2009 there was enough demand to hold a World Tantrix Open.

World Opens
 2014 World Tantrix Table Open (Bischoffen, Germany)
 2013 World Tantrix Table Open (Trosa, Sweden)
 2011 World Tantrix Table Open (Almere, Netherlands)
 2010 World Tantrix Table Open (Budapest, Hungary)
 2009 World Tantrix Table Open (Edinburgh, United Kingdom)

National Opens
 The British Table Open, first held in 2002
 The New Zealand Table Open, first held in 2004
 The Swedish Table Open, first held in 2004
 The German Table Open, first held in 2005
 The French Table Open, first held in 2005
 The Spanish Table Open, first held in 2005
 The Hungarian Table Open, first held in 2005
 The Dutch Table Open, first held in 2006
 The Polish Table Open, first held in 2007
 The Australian Table Open, first held in 2007
 The Israeli Table Open, first held in 2007

History
The first version of Tantrix was created by Mike McManaway in 1988 and was called Mind Game. It used 56 cardboard pieces with only two coloured lines, red and black. Owning a games shop, McManaway sold the game directly and following customer feedback continued to change the rules and design. In 1991, the tiles were changed to plastic and two more colours were added, allowing for four-player games.

The tiles were (and still are) hand-painted, featuring different colours to those now used, even pink. The early form of the game featured eight "triple intersections", but these were found to slow the game play as they only fitted into three different forced spaces (compared to six for all other tiles). So in 1993, the triple intersections were removed from the game.

Along with the multiplayer version of the game, McManaway created smaller solitaire puzzles using 10 or 12 tiles that required the player to put the tiles together to create loops of certain colours.

McManaway has also created many solitaire puzzles, including 3-D versions, match only versions (requiring players to colour match tiles within a confined space) and loop and line versions (requiring players to use all the nominated tiles to complete a loop or line in a specific colour). However many of the editions are no longer available.

The main versions sold in most countries are:

: A solo version, where players attempt puzzles that take between 30 seconds and 45 minutes.
: A set of 14 tiles designed to play Tantrix Solitaire combined with expanded Tantrix Discovery puzzles.
: Tantrix meets sudoku. A number of pre-placed clues controls the difficulty of each puzzle.
: A bag with all 56 Tantrix tiles, with which players can play all editions of Tantrix.
Tantrix got its first big contract in 1994 when Air France bought the game to give to children on its flights.  In 2003 Tantrix was named Toy of the Year in Hungary and won the British National Association of Toy and Leisure Libraries gold award in the games category.

Tileset

See also
 Black Path Game
 List of world championships in mind sports
 Palago, a hexagonal tile game co-invented by Mike McManaway
 Serpentiles
 Trax, a connection game played with similar tiles but different gameplay

Notes

External links
 Official Tantrix website, including the history of Tantrix and Tournaments and online play.
 Tantrix an online Tantrix puzzle
 
 Tantrix puzzles and their solutions

Board games introduced in 1988
Tiling puzzles
Tile-based board games
 Abstract strategy games
Logic puzzles
Tabletop games